The Princess Diaries soundtracks are soundtracks of the films The Princess Diaries (2001) and The Princess Diaries 2: Royal Engagement (2004) starring Julie Andrews and Anne Hathaway. The albums contain songs sung by well-known charting artists as well as performers signed to Disney that the company wanted to promote. They were released by Walt Disney Records.

The Princess Diaries soundtrack

Track listing

Charts

The Princess Diaries score
The movie's score, composed and conducted by John Debney, was also released by Walt Disney Records. This was the first film he scored for director Garry Marshall; Debney wrote the scores for all of Marshall's subsequent films.

Track listing

The Princess Diaries 2: Royal Engagement soundtrack

Track listing

Charts

References

Disney film soundtracks
2000s film soundtrack albums
2001 soundtrack albums
2004 soundtrack albums
Walt Disney Records soundtracks
John Debney soundtracks
Soundtracks
Lists of soundtracks